Philibert Chabert (6 January 1737 – 8 September 1814) was a French agronomist and veterinarian. He was an important educator and director and the École National Vétérinaire d'Alfort, where he greatly increased the school's important anatomy and natural history cabinet.  In 1774, he wrote a treatise on methods to control an anthrax epizootic occurring in Saint-Domingue.

References

1737 births
1814 deaths
Chevaliers of the Légion d'honneur
French agronomists
French veterinarians
Members of the French Academy of Sciences
Scientists from Lyon